Nikol Rodomakina (Russian: Николь Родомакина, born 14 February 1993) is a Paralympic athlete from Russia competing mainly in category T46 sprint and F46 long jump events. Between 2011 and 2013 Rodomakina was World, Paralympic and European champion in the F46 long jump.

Career history
Rodomakina competed in her first Summer Paralympics at the 2008 Games in Beijing, China. She entered both the women's 100 metres and 200 metres sprints in the T46 classification. She qualified for the finals for both events,  but failed to medal in either finishing 5th in the 100m and 7th in the 200m.

In 2011 Rodomakina entered the 2011 IPC Athletics World Championships in Christchurch, New Zealand. She took the silver in both her sprint events, the 100m and 200m T46 races. She also qualified for the F44/46 long jump and took the gold medal after posting a distance of 5.67m in her final jump.

At the 2012 Summer Paralympics in London, Rodomakina competed in the 100 metres, 200 metres and the long jump. She won a silver medal in the women's 100 metres T46 event,  but failed to reach the podium in the 200 metres, finishing one hundredth of a second behind bronze medalist Anrune Liebenberg of South Africa. She also continued her success in the long jump, this time competing in the F46 classification, again taking the gold medal.

At the 2013 IPC Athletics World Championships in Lyon she entered the 100m T46 sprint and the T46 long jump. She won silver in the sprint but successfully defended her long jump world title posting a personal best of 5.92m.

References

External links
 

1993 births
Living people
Paralympic athletes of Russia
Athletes (track and field) at the 2008 Summer Paralympics
Athletes (track and field) at the 2012 Summer Paralympics
Athletes (track and field) at the 2020 Summer Paralympics
Paralympic gold medalists for Russia
Paralympic silver medalists for Russia
Russian female sprinters
Russian female long jumpers
Medalists at the 2012 Summer Paralympics
Paralympic medalists in athletics (track and field)
Sprinters with limb difference
Long jumpers with limb difference
Paralympic sprinters
Paralympic long jumpers